The St George's, Hanover Square by-election of 1913 was held on 15 July 1913.  The by-election was held due to the death of the incumbent Conservative MP, Alfred Lyttelton.  It was won by the Conservative candidate Sir Alexander Henderson, who was elected unopposed.

References 

St George's, Hanover Square by-election
St George's, Hanover Square by-election
St George's, Hanover Square by-election
St George's, Hanover Square,1913
Unopposed by-elections to the Parliament of the United Kingdom in English constituencies
St George's, Hanover Square by-election
St George's, Hanover Square,1912